The 2009 1000 km of Catalunya was the opening round of the 2009 Le Mans Series season. It took place at the Circuit de Catalunya in Montmeló, Spain on 5 April 2009. Aston Martin Racing won overall on their debut of the Lola-Aston Martin B09/60, while Lola also secured the LMP2 win with Racing Box. The GT1 category was won by the IPB Spartak Racing Lamborghini, while Team Felbermayr-Proton's Porsche led GT2.

Report

Qualifying

Qualifying result

Pole position winners in each class are marked in bold.

Race

Race results
Class winners in bold. Cars failing to complete 70% of winner's distance marked as Not Classified (NC).

References

External links

 Le Mans Series - Catalunya

Catalunya
1000